David Ross Fryer is an American ethicist and writer working in phenomenology, queer theory, Africana thought, existentialism (in particular Black Existentialism), contemporary Jewish thought, and psychoanalytic theory.

Education
Fryer completed a B.A. (honors) in Intellectual History and Religious Studies at The University of Pennsylvania, studying under Alan Kors and Stephen Dunning; doctoral research in Philosophy at The University of Edinburgh, studying under Vincent Hope; and an A.M and Ph.D. in Contemporary Religious Thought and Gender Studies at Brown University, studying under Wendell Dietrich and Elizabeth Weed.

Career
Fryer's first book, The Intervention of the Other:  Ethical Subjectivity in Levinas and Lacan, received positive reviews in both philosophical  and psychoanalytic circles. His second book, Thinking Queerly:  Race, Sex, Gender, and the Ethics of Identity  and the work within it has both been cited by prominent academics  and received attention in the queer blogosphere.  He has been affiliated with the Institute for the Study of Race and Social Thought and the Center for Afro-Judaic Studies, both at Temple University.  He is a founding member of the Phenomenology Roundtable.   He has taught at institutions including the University of Pennsylvania, Temple University, Drexel University. Since 2021 he has been recovering from a heart transplant.

References

Queer theorists
Jewish philosophers
American ethicists
1969 births
Living people
University of Pennsylvania alumni
Brown University alumni
Drexel University faculty